Luise Kinseher (born 4 January 1969 in Geiselhöring) is a German cabaret artist and actress.

Life 
Luise Kinseher, who was raised in the Lower Bavarian city of Geiselhöring, studied German philology, dramatics, and history in Munich. She wrote her Master's thesis about Sigi Zimmerschied and gained first stage experience as a cabaret actress in 1992. From 1993 to 1998 she was an ensemble member of the Iberl Bühne in Munich-Solln, where she worked with Georg Maier and performed in more than 800 shows.

In 1998 she showcased her first solo programme Ende der Ausbaustrecke - Silent Thrill of Kabarett.

Director Franz Xaver Bogner discovered Kinseher as a Bavarian actress and cast her for his TV shows in key roles, for example as Hanna Graf in Café Meineid and as police station manager Thekla Eichenseher in München 7. As personal assistant Gabi Blümel she regularly reviews the cabaret weekly review of the Bavarian Television programme Nix für ungut. In 2010, she played the role of the Bavaria for the first time in the singspiel of the traditional politician Derblecken on the Nockherberg. She was the first woman ever to hold the Salvator speech in this role in 2011. From 2012 to 2018 she represented Mama Bavaria on the Nockherberg.

Her stage programme Einfach reich celebrated its premier in 2010 in Munich's Lach- und Schießgesellschaft.

Luise Kinseher lives in Munich.

Solo programmes 

 1998: Ende der Ausbaustrecke - Silent Thrill of Kabarett
 2001: Schnop - der Weg ist weg
 2004: Glück & Co
 2007: Hotel Freiheit
 2010: Einfach reich
 2014: Ruhe bewahren

Discography 
 Schnop - Der Weg ist Weg, WortArt Köln 2002, 
 Glück & Co, WortArt Köln, 2005, 
 Hotel Freiheit, WortArt Köln, 2008, 
 Einfach reich, WortArt Köln, 2011,

Filmography 
 1996–1998: Anwalt Abel (2 episodes)
 1996: Tatort: Schattenwelt
 1999: SOKO 5113: Das Doppelleben des Werner Eck
 2000–2003: Café Meineid (42 episodes)
 2000: Einmal leben
 2001: Alle meine Töchter: Der Bumerang-Effekt
 2001: Jenny & Co.: Kinder, Kinder
 since 2004: München 7 (36 episodes)
 2006: Die Rosenheim-Cops: Tod eines Ekels
 2007: Das große Hobeditzn
 2007: 
 2007: 
 2010: Die Rosenheim-Cops: Späte Rache
 2010: Nix für ungut! (4 Episoden)
 2010–2013: Auf dem Nockherberg (4 episodes)
 2011: Intensiv-Station – Die NDR Satireshow
 2011–2012: Ottis Schlachthof (2 episodes)
 2015: Die Anstalt (one episode, 20 October 2015)
 2017:

Awards 
 1999: Passauer Scharfrichterbeil
 2002: Mindener Stichling, Solo prize
 2002: Deutscher Kleinkunstpreis, Sponsorship prize
 2003: Kabarettpreis der Landeshauptstadt München
 2012: Bairische Sprachwurzel, Straubing
 2013: Ernst-Hoferichter-Preis of the capital city Munich
 2014: Bayerischer Kabarettpreis, Main prize

References

External links 

 Official website
 Schwester Barnabella Portrait, Süddeutsche Zeitung from October 9, 2010
 Kabarettistin Luise Kinseher – "Derblecken ist keine Bußpredigt" Interview with Wolfgang Görl in: Süddeutsche Zeitung from November 16, 2010

German cabaret performers
German actresses
1969 births
Living people